Arcidens confragosus is a species of freshwater mussels in the family Unionidae, the river mussels. It is commonly known as the rock pocketbook, but also has many other common names: bastard, black pocketbook, grandmaw, queen, and rockshell.

Distribution
This species is widespread in central parts of the United States: it occurs in the Mississippi River drainage and in coastal rivers draining to the Gulf of Mexico, from the Colorado River in Texas east to the Mobile River System in Alabama.

Description
The shell is green to dark brown. The nacre is white, iridescent.

References

Unionidae
Bivalves of North America
Freshwater animals of North America
Molluscs of the United States
Endemic fauna of the United States
Molluscs described in 1829
Taxa named by Thomas Say